The rufous-sided gerygone (Gerygone dorsalis) is a species of bird in the family Acanthizidae.
It is found in the eastern Lesser Sunda Islands and Kai Islands.

Its natural habitats are subtropical or tropical moist lowland forests and subtropical or tropical mangrove forests.

References

rufous-sided gerygone
Birds of the Maluku Islands
Birds of the Lesser Sunda Islands
rufous-sided gerygone
rufous-sided gerygone
Taxonomy articles created by Polbot